Blessed Event is a 1932 American pre-Code comedy-drama film directed by Roy Del Ruth and starring Lee Tracy as a newspaper gossip columnist who becomes entangled with a gangster. The Tracy character (Alvin Roberts) was reportedly patterned after Walter Winchell, famous gossip columnist of the era. The film was Dick Powell's film debut.

Plot
Alvin Roberts feuds with singer Bunny Harmon. Roberts reports on society people who are expecting a "blessed event", i.e. going to have a child. One such report antagonizes a gangster in a delicate situation, who sends over a henchman to threaten him. Roberts manages to turn the tables on the gangster.

The character of Bunny Harmon is a parody of Rudy Vallee, as both of them sing and play saxophone, and Vallee's band was called the Connecticut Yankees, while Harmon's is the Green Mountain Boys, a reference to another New England state, Vermont. The feud between Roberts and Harmon is a parody of the real-life (contrived) feud between Walter Winchell and bandleader Ben Bernie.

Cast
 Lee Tracy as Alvin Roberts
 Mary Brian as Gladys Price
 Dick Powell as Bunny Harmon
 Allen Jenkins as Frankie Wells
 Ruth Donnelly as Miss Stevens
 Emma Dunn as Mrs. Roberts
 Edwin Maxwell as Sam Goebel
 Ned Sparks as George Moxley
 Walter Walker as Mr. Miller
 Frank McHugh as Reilly
 Herman Bing as Emil
 George Chandler as Hanson (uncredited)
 Isabel Jewell as Dorothy Lane (uncredited)

References

External links
 
 
 
 

1932 films
1932 comedy-drama films
American comedy-drama films
American black-and-white films
1930s English-language films
Films about journalists
Films directed by Roy Del Ruth
American gangster films
Warner Bros. films
1930s American films
English-language comedy-drama films